JSci Med Central is a publisher of various academic journals from Hyderabad, India.
JSciMed Central has been included on Beall's List of potential predatory open-access publishers, and has faced other criticisms of its publishing practices.

Activities 
JSciMed Central was incorporated in Hyderabad in 2013. The company uses an Open Access model of publishing, which charges the authors. Articles are distributed online and free of cost or other barriers. The company claims that articles are peer reviewed before publication. In November 2022 the company published about 144 journals in the fields of Medical, Clinical, Chemical, Engineering, Pharmacy, and Life Sciences. As of 2022, most or all of its journals do not have a scientific editor in chief. JSciMed Central' journals are not listed in Clarivate's Web of Science, and not indexed in National Library of Medicine's MEDLINE.

Criticism 
JSciMed Central was listed in Beall's List of potential predatory open-access publishers. The company has been criticized for sending out email spam to scientists, calling out for papers,
to use fake addresses from the US, and to publish journals that have not achieved indexing in any recognized service, and were therefore considered as potential or probable predatory open-access journals.

Journals

References

Academic publishing companies
Open access publishers
Companies based in Hyderabad, India